The Formula One Indoor Trophy or Trofeo Indoor Formula One was a non-championship Formula One sprint held at the Bologna Motor Show between 1988 and 1996. Despite having Indoor in the name of the race, the race was staged outside in a parking lot outside of the arena that hosted the show. The first race was won by Luis Pérez-Sala. The last running of the event was the last non-championship Formula One competition and was won by Giancarlo Fisichella in a Benetton-Renault; the event switched to using Formula 3000 machinery from 1997 onwards; the event was rebranded Bologna Motor Show F3000 Sprint as a result.

Winners of the Indoor Trophy

References

 Bologna Motor Show History
 Bologna Sprint - The GEL Motorsport Information Page

 
Formula One non-championship races